Laquincy Rideau (born March 28, 1996) is an American professional basketball player for Punto Rojo LR of the Liga Ecuatoriana de Baloncesto. He played college basketball for the Gardner–Webb Runnin' Bulldogs and South Florida Bulls.

Early life and high school career
Rideau began his high school career at Palm Beach Lakes Community High School. Prior to his senior season, he transferred to Blanche Ely High School. Rideau had three triple-doubles on an undefeated Class 7A championship team. He averaged 16.2 points, 6.8 assists, 5.3 rebounds and 4.9 steals per game, garnering Class 7A all-state first team honors. Rideau was lightly recruited, committed to playing college basketball for Gardner–Webb over Saint Peter's.

College career
Rideau averaged 5.8 points, 2.5 assists, and 2 steals per game as a freshman. As a sophomore, Rideau averaged 14.2 points, 5.7 rebounds, 5.2 assists, and 3 steals per game. He was named to the Second Team All-Big South. Following his sophomore season, Rideau transferred to South Florida, choosing the Bulls over Rutgers, Iona, Providence, and Florida Gulf Coast. He sat out the 2017–18 season as a redshirt per NCAA rules, but injured his foot shortly after signing with South Florida, which kept him from practicing until January 2018. On January 12, 2019, Rideau posted a triple double of 18 points, 10 assists, and 10 steals in an 82–80 overtime loss to Temple. On April 2, he scored a career-high 35 points along with eight assists and four steals in the second game of the College Basketball Invitational against DePaul. Rideau averaged 13.4 points, 5.4 assists and 2.9 steals per game as a junior, earning AAC Defensive Player of the Year honors. Following the season, he declared for the 2019 NBA draft, but ultimately withdrew to return to South Florida. As a senior, Rideau averaged 12.6 points, 4.4 rebounds and 2.5 steals per game.

Professional career
After going undrafted in the 2020 NBA draft, Rideau joined Résidence Walferdange of the Total League. He averaged 20.1 points, 7.3 rebounds, 5 assists, and 3.1 steals per game. On December 2, 2021, Rideau signed with KK Šentjur of the Premier A Slovenian Basketball League.

Career statistics

College

|-
| style="text-align:left;"| 2015–16
| style="text-align:left;"| Gardner–Webb
| 33 || 1 || 15.8 || .437 || .300 || .457 || 2.2 || 2.5 || 2.0 || .1 || 5.8
|-
| style="text-align:left;"| 2016–17
| style="text-align:left;"| Gardner–Webb
| 33 || 30 || 28.8 || .470 || .390 || .579 || 5.7 || 5.2 || 3.0 || .3 || 14.2
|-
| style="text-align:left;"| 2017–18
| style="text-align:left;"| South Florida
| style="text-align:center;" colspan="11"|  Redshirt
|-
| style="text-align:left;"| 2018–19
| style="text-align:left;"| South Florida
| 35 || 34 || 32.1 || .409 || .338 || .549 || 3.7 || 5.4 || 2.9 || .1 || 13.4
|-
| style="text-align:left;"| 2019–20
| style="text-align:left;"| South Florida
| 31 || 31 || 32.5 || .374 || .295 || .562 || 4.4 || 4.2 || 2.5 || .2 || 12.6
|- class="sortbottom"
| style="text-align:center;" colspan="2"| Career
| 132 || 96 || 27.3 || .418 || .328 || .549 || 4.0 || 4.3 || 2.6 || .2 || 11.5

Personal life
Rideau has four siblings. His father, Greg Rideau, pitched in the Cleveland Indians organization and is a police officer. His mother is a middle school culinary-arts teacher.

See also
List of NCAA Division I men's basketball career steals leaders

References

External links
South Florida Bulls bio
Gardner–Webb Runnin' Bulldogs bio

1996 births
Living people
American men's basketball players
American expatriate basketball people in Luxembourg
Basketball players from Florida
Sportspeople from West Palm Beach, Florida
Blanche Ely High School alumni
Gardner–Webb Runnin' Bulldogs men's basketball players
South Florida Bulls men's basketball players
Point guards